Oralee Fowler (born 26 August 1961) is a Bahamian sprinter. She competed in the women's 4 × 100 metres relay at the 1984 Summer Olympics.

References

External links
 

1961 births
Living people
Athletes (track and field) at the 1984 Summer Olympics
Bahamian female sprinters
Olympic athletes of the Bahamas
Place of birth missing (living people)
Olympic female sprinters